Lahur Talabany, born 1975, also known as Lahur Sheikh Jangi Talabany is the Co-President of the (PUK) and the former Director of the Zanyari Agency, and Former Director of the Counter Terrorism Group (CTG). Known commonly as Sheikh Lahur, Talabany was a leading figure in the fight against terror especially in the fight against ISIS.

Political and Military Career 
From 1999 to 2001 Talabany served as the Special Representative of the PUK to Turkey. Having returned to the Kurdistan Region, he co-founded the Counter-Terrorism Group (CTG) in 2002, which was established with the support of the United States Military 10th Special Forces Group and the Central Intelligence Agency. Talabany continues to play an integral role in the fight against terrorism. Talabany is a well respected and distinguished figure in the Iraqi political, military and intelligence communities. A staunch ally of the United States and the West, Talabany continues to be an influential and crucial figure in the security and political fields in Middle East and the wider region. Having established strong foundations with key figures in Iraq, Talabany also maintains good relations with prominent Arab leaders and influential Western and Middle Eastern states. Since July 2021 there is a struggle over the leadership go the PUK, in which Bafel Talabani accuses Lahur of poisoning him while Lahur rejects such claims and calls for a resolution within the leadership council of the PUK.

Counter 

In response to the rise of extremist groups in the Hawraman area of the Kurdistan Region of Iraq, Talabany was instrumental in the creation of Kurdistan's first counter-terrorism elite special forces. Countering terrorism in relatively few numbers at the outset, the CTG forces have grown in number and are considered a well established rapid response unit. Highly trained and well equipped, the CTG forces under Talabany's leadership have repelled and eliminated countless terrorist threats to the Kurdistan Region and Iraq.

Ansar Al Islam and Operation Viking Hammer 

In 2003 Talabany played a leading role in the decisive Operation Viking Hammer to oust the Ansar Al-Islam terrorist organization, which was recognized as a major threat to Kurdistan’s national security. The operation’s success led to the permanent expulsion of Ansar Al-Islam from the Kurdistan Region.

Co-President of the Patriotic Union 
In February 2020, he was elected to serve as the Co-President of the (PUK) alongside Bafel Talabani.

Zanyari Agency 
In 2013, Talabany was appointed as the Director of the Zanyari Agency (the Intelligence Unit of the PUK). Upon his appointment, one of Talabany's first actions was to incorporate the CTG into Zanyari Agency. The new framework adopted by the Agency was a historic shift as it was the first time in the Kurdistan Region that a military entity was integrated into an intelligence agency. Talabany has played a pivotal role in unifying the Kurdish intelligence apparatus as well as modernizing Zanyari to better combat evolving national and regional security threats. Upon becoming director, Talabany developed a strong strategic partnership with his counterparts in other services.

Personal life 
Talabany is married and a father of three children, two sons, and a daughter. Talabany has five brothers and two sisters. He is fluent in Kurdish, English, Turkish, Arabic and Persian. Talabany is an avid football fan and supports Liverpool FC. He takes a keen interest in ancient history and enjoys painting. Lahur is the nephew of Jalal Talabani.

References

External links 

Reuters After Mosul, jihadist threat to Iraq will grow
VICE News HBO The Fight Against ISIL
Sky News Child Suicide Bombers
Newsweek Middle East Without post-Daesh plan, history will repeat itself in Iraq and Syria
Reuters Special Report: Under siege in Mosul, Islamic State turns to executions and paranoia
The Washington Institute The Iraqi Kurdish Battle Against ISIS: Reports from the Front

Living people
1975 births
Iraqi Kurdish people
Patriotic Union of Kurdistan politicians